Loorents Hertsi (born 13 November 1992) is a Finnish professional footballer who plays for Lahti, as a winger.

Career
Hertsi has played for Lahti, Lahti Akatemia, Hämeenlinna and VPS.

AC Oulu announced the signing of Hertsi for the 2019 season, on 24 December 2018.

On 21 December 2020, he returned to Lahti for the 2021 season.

References

External links

1992 births
Living people
Finnish footballers
FC Lahti players
FC Kuusysi players
FC Hämeenlinna players
AC Oulu players
Vaasan Palloseura players
Kakkonen players
Ykkönen players
Veikkausliiga players
Association football wingers
Footballers from Helsinki